The Jewish Review was a twice-monthly, non-profit newspaper published in Portland, Oregon, United States. The paper had been published from 1959 to 2012 by the Jewish Federation of Greater Portland. It relaunched on March 4, 2020 as an online only bi-weekly publication.

References

External links
Jewish Review

1959 establishments in Oregon
2012 disestablishments in Oregon
Defunct newspapers published in Oregon
Jews and Judaism in Portland, Oregon
Jewish newspapers published in the United States
Newspapers established in 1959
Newspapers published in Portland, Oregon
Publications disestablished in 2012